The 2020–21 Belgian Division 3 was the fifth season of the division in its current format, placed at the fifth-tier of football in Belgium and the first under this name, after being renamed (Belgian) Division 3 from (Belgian) Third Amateur Division. The season was cancelled in January 2021 with just a few matches played, as measures taken by the Belgian government against the spread of COVID-19 prohibited amateur football.

The division consist of four separate leagues. Leagues VFV A and VFV B consist of teams with a license from the Voetbalfederatie Vlaanderen (VFV, the Flemish/Dutch speaking wing of the Belgian FA), while the leagues ACFF A and ACFF B contain teams with a license from the Association des Clubs Francophones de Football (ACFF, the French-speaking wing of the RBFA). The champions from each of the four leagues would normally have been promoted to the 2021–22 Belgian Division 2, but due to the cancellation no teams were promoted or relegated.

Team changes

In
 Hamme, Sint-Niklaas, Namur FLV and Onhaye were all relegated from the 2019–20 Belgian Second Amateur Division.
 Lille, Koersel, Voorde-Appelterre and Oostkamp were promoted as champions of the Flemish Belgian Provincial Leagues, respectively in Antwerp, Limburg, East Flanders and West Flanders.
 Binche, Dison, Marloie and Tamines were promoted as champions of the Walloon Belgian Provincial Leagues, respectively in Hainaut, Liège, Luxembourg and Namur.
 Crossing Schaerbeek was promoted as the champion of the French-speaking teams in the region matching the former Province of Brabant and Brussels.
 Diest was promoted as the champion of the Flemish-speaking teams in the region matching the former Province of Brabant and Brussels.
 With the 2019–20 season ending prematurely due to the COVID-19 pandemic in Belgium, all vacant positions were filled up by the highest finishing teams from the same province as the disappearing clubs. Clubs promoted as a result per province:
 Antwerp: Racing Mechelen, De Kempen, Berlaar-Heikant, Nijlen
 Flemish-speaking teams from the former Province of Brabant and Brussels: Rhodienne-De Hoek
 French-speaking teams from the former Province of Brabant and Brussels: Stockel
 East Flanders: Bambrugge
 Liège: Wanze Bas-Oha
 Luxembourg: Gouvy
 West Flanders: Anzegem

Out
 Zelzate was promoted after winning the 2019–20 Belgian Third Amateur Division A.
 Lyra-Lierse was promoted after winning the 2019–20 Belgian Third Amateur Division B.
 Ganshoren was promoted after winning the 2019–20 Belgian Third Amateur Division C.
 Warnant was promoted after winning the 2019–20 Belgian Third Amateur Division D.
 As no promotion play-offs could be held due to the 2019–20 season ending prematurely due to the COVID-19 pandemic in Belgium, Ninove, Brakel, Wetteren, City Pirates, Heur-Tongeren, Houtvenne, Ganshoren and Jette were all promoted based on their finishing position.
 Based on their finishing positions at the bottom of the table, Oostnieuwkerke, Bornem, Bilzen, Helson Helchteren, Linden, Kosova Schaerbeek, Léopold Uccle, Wavre, Spy, Meix-devant-Virton and Ciney were all relegated to the Belgian Provincial Leagues.
 Furthermore two clubs were without a license and hence were also relegated to the Belgian Provincial Leagues: Wingene (had not applied for a license) and Walhain (moved to Beauvechain and changed its name to FC Golden Black causing its license to be removed).

Belgian Division 3 VFV A

League table

Belgian Division 3 VFV B

League table

Belgian Division 3 ACFF A

League table

Belgian Division 3 ACFF B

League table

Number of teams by provinces

References

Belgian Third Amateur Division
Bel
5
Bel